Kursk State University (Russian Курский государственный университет) is Kursk's oldest higher educational institution, founded in 1934 as Kursk State Pedagogical Institute, later in 1994 transformed into Kursk State Pedagogical University and has a current status since 2003.

University today
Today, the university is a science and education center offering modern educational technologies and various forms of vocational training within 99 licensed specialties of higher education (specialist, bachelor and master programmes) as well as PhD programmes in 38 areas of specialisation.

The staff of about 900 tutors and researchers in the 67 university departments includes 93 faculty members possess full doctorate degrees, and 440 have PhD degrees.

Kursk State University operates six education buildings, over 100 natural science labs with a variety of high-tech equipment, nearly 50 specialised study rooms for the humanities, an astronomical observatory, ten multimedia classrooms, a conference hall, a TV-centre, industrial training facilities, art studios, a library and reading halls, zoological, mineralogical and archeological museums, a biological and agricultural testing centre, gymnasiums and many other facilities. The construction of a seventh building and a community centre is currently under way. Additional facilities include three hostels and a student medical centre.

Faculties
Physics and Mathematics
Natural Sciences and Geography 
Computer Sciences 
Philology 
Foreign Languages 
History
Economics and Management
Law 
Pedagogics and Psychology
Industrial Education
Special Needs Education
Philosophy, Social and Cultural Studies
Theology and Religious Studies
Fine Arts
Arts
Physical Training and Sport
Professional Retraining
Preparatory Studies
Actual Applied Specialties

See also
 Kursk State University Library

External links
 Kursk State University website

Kursk
Universities in Kursk Oblast
Cultural heritage monuments in Kursk Oblast
Objects of cultural heritage of Russia of regional significance